Oblivion may refer to:

Film
 Oblivion (1994 film), an American space Western
 Oblivion (2013 film), an American post-apocalyptic science fiction film

Literature
 Oblivion (Power of Five), a 2012 novel by Anthony Horowitz
 Oblivion (Stone novel), a 1998 Bernice Summerfield/Doctor Who novel by Dave Stone
 Oblivion, a novel by Peter Abrahams
 Oblivion: Stories, a 2004 story collection by David Foster Wallace
 Oblivion, a 1999 book by Harry Maihafer about the disappearance of Richard Colvin Cox
 Oblivion, a play by Carly Mensch

Music

Artists and labels
 Oblivion (metal band), an American band formed in 2007
 Oblivion (punk band), an American band 1988–2000
 Oblivion Records, an American record label 19721976
 Oblivion, a sub-label of the German record label SPV GmbH

Albums
 Oblivion (Biff Bang Pow! album), 1987
 Oblivion (Kaliopi album) or the title song, 2009
 Oblivion (Orphanage album), 1995
 Oblivion (Smile Empty Soul album), 2018
 Oblivion (Utopia album), 1984
 Oblivion (T-Pain album), 2017
 Oblivion EP, by Mastodon, or the title song (see below), 2009
 Oblivion!, EP by Sundara Karma, 2022
 Oblivion, by Astor Piazzolla, 1982
 Oblivion, by Crematory, 2018
 Oblivion, by D-Rok, or the title song, 1991
 Oblivion, by Redshift, 2004

Songs
 "Oblivion" (Bastille song), 2014
 "Oblivion" (Grimes song), 2012
 "Oblivion" (Hastang song), 2007
 "Oblivion" (M83 song), 2013
 "Oblivion" (Mastodon song), 2009
 "Oblivion" (Terrorvision song), 1994
 "Oblivion", by 30 Seconds to Mars from 30 Seconds to Mars, 2002
 "Oblivion", by Atreyu from Baptize, 2021
 "Oblivion", by the Baptist Generals from Jackleg Devotional to the Heart, 2013
 "Oblivion", by Bud Powell from The Genius of Bud Powell, 1956
 "Oblivion", by Chelsea Grin from My Damnation, 2011
 "Oblivion", by Labrinth featuring Sia from Imagination & the Misfit Kid, 2019
 "Oblivion", by Lacuna Coil from Shallow Life, 2009
 "Oblivion", by M. Pokora from Mise à jour, 2010
 "Oblivion", by Mors Principium Est from Inhumanity, 2003
 "Oblivion", by Mudhoney from Tomorrow Hit Today, 1998
 "Oblivion", by Patrick Wolf from The Bachelor, 2009
 "Oblivion', by Royal Blood from Typhoons, 2021
 "Oblivion", by Suffocation from Suffocation, 2006
 "Oblivion", by Vektor from Black Future, 2009
 "Oblivion", by the Winery Dogs from Hot Streak, 2015
 "Oblivion", by Wintersleep from Welcome to the Night Sky, 2007
 "Oblivion", by Young the Giant from Mirror Master, 2018
 "Oblivion (Creation)", by Jhené Aiko from Trip, 2017

Other uses
 The Elder Scrolls IV: Oblivion, a 2006 role-playing video game
 Eternal oblivion, the belief in the permanent cessation of one's consciousness upon death
 Nick Aldis (born 1986), British professional wrestler known as Oblivion in the UK television series Gladiators
 Oblivion (roller coaster), a roller coaster in England
 Oblivion: The Black Hole, a roller coaster in Italy

See also
 Obliveon, Canadian band
 Ash heap of history
 Lethe, the river of oblivion in Greek mythology
 Oblivious (disambiguation)